The 2003 American Handball Men's Youth Championships took place in São José dos Pinhais and Curitiba  from September 24 – 28.

Teams

Preliminary round

Group A

Group B

Placement 5th–7th

Final round

Semifinals

Bronze medal match

Gold medal match

Final standing

References 
 brasilhandebol.com.br 

2003 in handball
Pan American Men's Youth Handball Championship
2003 in Brazilian sport